The quinhydrone electrode may be  used to measure the hydrogen ion concentration (pH) of a solution  containing an acidic substance.

Principles and operation
Quinones form a quinhydrone species via hydrogen bonding between ρ-quinone and ρ-hydroquinone. An equimolar mixture of ρ-quinones and ρ-hydroquinone in contact with an inert metallic electrode, such as antimony, forms a quinhydrone electrode.  Such devices can be used to measure the pH of solutions. Quinhydrone electrodes provide fast response times and high accuracy. However, it can only measure pH in the range of 1 to 9 and the solution must not contain a strong oxidizing or reducing agent.  

A platinum wire electrode is immersed in a saturated aqueous solution of quinhydrone, in which there is the following equilibrium

   + 2H+ +2e−.

The potential difference between the platinum electrode and a reference electrode is dependent on the activity, of hydrogen ions in the solution.

 (Nernst equation)

Limitations
The quinhydrone electrode provides an alternative to the most commonly used glass electrode. however, it is not reliable above pH 8 (at 298 K) and cannot be used with solutions that contain a strong oxidizing or reducing agent.

References 

Electroanalytical chemistry devices
Electrodes